Angela Atede (born 8 February 1972) is a Nigerian athlete who mainly competes in the 100 metres hurdles. Her personal best is 12.72 seconds, achieved in 1998.

Competition record

External links

1972 births
Living people
Nigerian female hurdlers
Athletes (track and field) at the 1994 Commonwealth Games
Athletes (track and field) at the 1996 Summer Olympics
Athletes (track and field) at the 2000 Summer Olympics
Athletes (track and field) at the 2002 Commonwealth Games
Olympic athletes of Nigeria
Commonwealth Games medallists in athletics
Commonwealth Games bronze medallists for Nigeria
African Games gold medalists for Nigeria
African Games medalists in athletics (track and field)
African Games silver medalists for Nigeria
Universiade medalists in athletics (track and field)
Athletes (track and field) at the 1995 All-Africa Games
Athletes (track and field) at the 1999 All-Africa Games
Athletes (track and field) at the 2003 All-Africa Games
Universiade gold medalists for Nigeria
Medalists at the 1997 Summer Universiade
20th-century Nigerian women
21st-century Nigerian women
Medallists at the 2002 Commonwealth Games